Walter Moore may refer to:

Walter Moore (politician) (born 1959), American lawyer, businessman and community activist in Los Angeles, California
Walter Scott Moore (1853–1919), president of the Los Angeles, California, Common Council
Walter Moore (footballer, born 1984), Guyanese international football player
Walter Moore (footballer, born 1899) (1899–1949), English football player for Nelson FC
Dobie Moore (Walter Moore, 1896–1947), American baseball player

See also
Walter P Moore, an engineering company